The Civil Society Leadership Institute (CSLI) is a not-for-profit training center founded in February 2007 as a civic education initiative of FIBRAS/Movimiento por Nicaragua—one of the largest pro-democracy movements in Central America.  Its founding-director is Félix Maradiaga who is also a Young Global Leader (2009–2013) by the World Economic Forum and a Yale World Fellow (2008) by Yale University.

Its mission is twofold: to foster transformational leadership based on the ideas of liberty and democracy and to educate grassroots activists about the fundamentals and importance of non-violent social change.

To accomplish this mission, the Institute identifies recruits and trains grassroots democracy activists in Nicaragua. CSLI alumni embark upon a meaningful participation in the development of their communities.

CSLI signature academic programs—taught in conjunction with Universidad Americana based in Managua—help participants reflect on key concepts such as open society, adaptive leadership and the politics of non-violent action.  In March 2007 CSLI became the first college-accredited leadership institute in Central America.

References

External links
Civil Society Leadership Institute
Woodrow Wilson Center
La Prensa

Politics of Nicaragua
Political organizations based in Nicaragua
Organizations based in Nicaragua